Oxalis may refer to:

 Oxalis, plant of the woodsorrel genus Oxalis
 Tadoritsuku Basho/Oxalis
 Oxalis da Meia Lua, dressage horse ridden in the 2006 FEI World Equestrian Games and at the 2008 Summer Olympics by Miguel Ralão Duarte